Danila Kozlov may refer to:
 Danila Kozlov (footballer, born 1997), Russian football defender and midfielder for Torpedo Moscow
 Danila Kozlov (footballer, born 2005), Russian football midfielder for Zenit St. Petersburg